Edwin J. Jones (August 22, 1858 – June 4, 1930) was an American businessman and politician.

Biography
Jones was born in Beaver Dam, Wisconsin and went to the Dodge County Schools. He moved to Morris, Minnesota in 1878, and married Nellie A. Butterfield on May 29, 1883. They had one son.

Jones was involved in the hardware and lumber businesses. He served on the Morris City Council, as village clerk, and as the city's first mayor in 1914. Jones also served in the Minnesota Senate from 1895 to 1902 and was a Republican.

He died at his home in Morris on June 4, 1930.

References

1858 births
1930 deaths
Politicians from Beaver Dam, Wisconsin
People from Morris, Minnesota
Businesspeople from Minnesota
Mayors of places in Minnesota
Minnesota city council members
Republican Party Minnesota state senators